Tropical Storm Debby was a tropical cyclone that caused extensive flooding in North Florida and Central Florida during late June 2012. The fourth tropical cyclone and named storm of the 2012 Atlantic hurricane season, Debby developed from a trough of low pressure in the central Gulf of Mexico on June 23. The formation of Debby marked the earliest formation on record of the fourth named storm within the Atlantic basin until this record was beaten by Tropical Storm Danielle in 2016. Despite a projected track toward landfall in Louisiana or Texas, the storm headed the opposite direction, moving slowly north-northeast and northeastward. The storm slowly strengthened, and at 1800 UTC on June 25, attained its peak intensity with maximum sustained winds of 65 mph (100 km/h). Dry air, westerly wind shear, and upwelling of cold waters prevented further intensification over the next 24 hours. Instead, Debby weakened, and by late on June 26, it was a minimal tropical storm. At 2100 UTC, the storm made landfall near Steinhatchee, Florida with winds of 40 mph (65 km/h). Once inland, the system continued to weaken while crossing Florida, and dissipated shortly after emerging into the Atlantic on June 27.

The storm dropped immense amounts of precipitation near its path. The Sopchoppy River, which reached its record height, flooded at least 400 structures in Wakulla County. Additionally, the Suwannee River reached its highest level since Hurricane Dora in 1964. Further south in Pasco County, the Anclote River and Pithlachascotee River overflowed, flooding communities with "head deep" water and causing damage to 106 homes. An additional 587 homes were inundated after the Black Creek overflowed in Clay County. Several roads and highways in North Florida were left impassable, including Interstate 10 and U.S. Route 90. U.S. Routes 19 and 98 were also inundated by coastal flooding. In Central and South Florida, damage was primarily caused by tornadoes, one of which caused a fatality. Overall, Debby caused at least $250 million in losses and 10 deaths, 8 in Florida and 1 each in Alabama and South Carolina.

Meteorological history

During mid-June, the Intertropical Convergence Zone (ITCZ) made its annual migration northward into the southern Gulf of Mexico. Coinciding with a Madden–Julian oscillation, a weak surface low pressure area developed on June 19, and subsequently moved inland over the Yucatán Peninsula. While the system crossed the peninsula, a tropical wave moved through the northwestern Caribbean Sea on June 18. The wave reached the Gulf of Mexico on June 20 and merged with the low a few days later, spawning a trough of low pressure on June 22. Located in the southeastern Gulf of Mexico, moderate vertical wind shear caused the system to remain disorganized. Nonetheless, Air Force Reserve Hurricane Hunter aircraft indicated that the trough acquired a low-level circulation on June 23, while ships in the area reported tropical storm force winds.

Becoming a tropical storm on June 23, Debby became the earliest fourth named storm in the Atlantic basin, surpassing the old record set by Hurricane Dennis on July 5, 2005, however with 2016's Danielle the record was beaten by three days. Initially, Debby was predicted to curve westward and potentially threaten Texas. A deepening trough would curve the storm westward, while wind shear was predicted to decrease. By 1200 UTC on June 24, the forecast path was shifted from east-central Texas to southeastern Louisiana. Despite persistent wind shear, Debby was strengthening and around that time, the storm attained its maximum sustained wind speed of 65 mph (100 km/h). Later on June 24, the National Hurricane Center noted in its next advisory that this "is a very difficult and highly uncertain forecast", citing Debby's slow movement and widespread computer forecast models.

The forecast track for Debby was shifted significantly to the east late on June 24, and it was predicted that the storm would move northward and make landfall near Panama City, Florida. However, the storm began to weaken due to increasing wind shear, drier air, and upwelling of cold water, caused by Debby's slow movement. It was initially composed of multiple small swirls, but consolidated into one well-defined low-level circulation by early on June 25. Due to its excessively slow movement and no prediction for acceleration, the National Hurricane Center remarked that, "the cyclone does not seem to be going anywhere anytime soon." A burst in deep convection occurred later on June 25, though adverse environmental conditions prevented re-intensification. Debby began curving east-northeastward and began to speed up on June 26, in response to a mid-latitude trough digging into the western Atlantic Ocean. While approaching the Florida Big Bend, Debby produced only a small area of deep convection on satellite imagery.

At 2100 UTC June 26, Debby made landfall near Steinhatchee, Florida with winds of 40 mph (65 km/h). Debby maintained tropical cyclone status while crossing Florida, but degenerated into a trough of low pressure by 1800 UTC on June 27. In the final advisory issued by the National Hurricane Center three hours later, the agency noted that Debby could eventually reacquire tropical characteristics. After its dissipation, however, the remnants did not regenerate into a tropical cyclone, but re-developed a new center of circulation and strengthened slightly due to baroclinic conditions. As it accelerated northward, Debby's remnants became increasingly frontal in nature, and once again degenerated into an open trough at 1800 UTC on June 30; at this time, the disturbance was located south of Newfoundland.

Preparations

Upon development of Debby on June 23, a tropical storm warning was issued from the mouth of the Pearl River to Morgan City, Louisiana, excluding New Orleans or Lake Pontchartrain. On the following day, a separate tropical storm warning was put into effect from the Mississippi and Alabama border to the mouth of the Ochlockonee River in Florida. At 1500 UTC on June 24, the tropical storm warning was extended to the mouth of the Suwannee River. Simultaneously, a tropical storm watch was issued from the Suwannee River to Anclote Key. These were all canceled at 1500 UTC on June 25, though a tropical storm warning was then implemented from Destin to Englewood, Florida. Early on June 26, a tropical storm warning was issued from Mexico Beach to Englewood, Florida. By 2100 UTC that day, the tropical storm warning was extended to the mouth of Steinhatchee River in Florida. This was discontinued after Debby became a tropical depression.

Several additional preparations took place in addition to tropical cyclone warnings and watches. According to the Federal government of the United States, nearly 25% of crude oil and natural gas production in the Gulf of Mexico was shut down. In Louisiana, Governor Bobby Jindal declared a state of emergency. On June 24, voluntary evacuations were issued for several areas in northwest Florida during the approach of the storm, especially Taylor and Wakulla Counties. Governor of Florida Rick Scott also declared a state of emergency on June 25. Additionally, mandatory evacuations were issued for St. George Island, Alligator Point, and other low-lying areas of Franklin County.

Impact

Throughout the Southeastern United States, nine people were killed in relation to Tropical Storm Debby. Of these, seven took place in Florida and one each in Alabama and South Carolina. Throughout Central and South Florida, the outer bands of the storm spawned 13 tornadoes: five in Collier County, two in Glades County, one in Hardee County, two in Highlands County, one in Miami-Dade County, and two in Palm Beach County. Overall, losses from the storm were estimated to have reached at least $250 million.

Florida

North Florida and Panhandle

Throughout June 25, an intense complex of thunderstorms developed to the north of Debby's center and produced torrential rains over the Florida Panhandle for much of the day. Rainfall caused numerous small creeks, streams, and rivers to rapidly exceed their banks and flood adjacent communities. Numerous homes were flooded, some up to the second story. Two bridges were damaged, and numerous roads around the county were washed out or closed. Over 400 structures were affected by flooding, including more than 170 mobile homes and nearly 200 single-family residences. Of these structures, 40 were destroyed, 61 had major flood damage, 41 suffered minor flood damage, and 271 were affected by flooding. Numerous roads were underwater and several area businesses received water intrusion in that city. U.S. Route 98 was over-washed just north of St. Marks. As a result, mandatory evacuations were ordered south of U.S. Route 98 and around the Sopchoppy River. In total, 67 people required rescuing. Losses throughout the county were assessed at $9.09 million.

The storm also produced adverse effects in Franklin County. The John Gorrie Memorial Bridge connecting Apalachicola to Eastpoint was closed on June 24 due to high winds. The St. George Island Bridge, a  bridge connecting Eastpoint to St. George Island over the Apalachicola Bay, was also closed on June 24 due to high winds. The bridge was opened later that day as both St. George Island and Alligator Point were put under a mandatory evacuation, requiring all people to leave immediately, and those remaining on the islands subject to arrest. St. George Island, a popular resort community and tourist destination, lost all power on June 24 due to high winds destroying three power poles in the Apalachicola Bay; a Progress Energy spokesperson stated that it could be days before power was restored because the conditions are too unsafe for workers. Flooding forced the closure of a few roads in Jefferson County, including U.S. Route 27 west of U.S. Route 19.

In Madison County, one house was surrounded by in overflowing retention pond near the city of Madison. State Road 51 in Lafayette County flooded, caused by the Steinhatchee River exceeding its banks. In Dixie County, several roads north of Cross City experienced flooding, while water entered at least 40 homes along the Steinhatchee River. In Columbia County, preliminary losses were placed in excess of $20 million as of July 3 and did not take into account hundreds of homes that remained flooded at the time. Several bridges were washed out due to the heavy rain; both U.S. Route 319 and U.S. Route 98 were closed due to flooding. In Suwannee County, the Suwannee River at Live Oak reached its highest crest since Hurricane Dora in 1964. As a result, State Road 40 was closed due to high water. Additionally, as many as 52 sinkholes were reported to have formed along roadways in the county. Flooding also occurred in Duval County. The public reported that water entered a home on Rose Street in Jacksonville. Streets were flooded in Orange Park, and water approached the doors of houses, forcing some residents to evacuate. The St. Marys River reached historic heights and flooded a lot homes in Baker and Nassau Counties.

Central Florida

In Levy County, tropical storm force winds were felt along the coast. Heavy rainfall was reported across the county, with the CoCoRaHS site near Chiefland of receiving . At Cedar Key, tides reached  mean lower low water on June 25. The highest storm surge was estimated to have peaked at  mean lower low water. A few buildings were flooded by the storm surge at Cedar Key and Yankeetown. In total, damage to public property was approximately $175,000. Overall, damage was minor, reaching about $127,000. Along the Anclote and Pithlachascotee Rivers in Pasco County, emergency managers ordered mandatory evacuations for 14,000–20,000 people as the rivers rose dramatically. At least 106 homes in the county were damaged by flood waters. Additionally, a tornado near New Port Richey caused major damage to five homes. Throughout the county, damage to private property was $1.5 million, while public property losses were estimated at $26 million. 

A man drowned near Lake Dorr in Lake County after his canoe capsized along a river in Ocala National Forest. In Polk County, a woman died after her car hydroplaned on a flooded road. Another person drowned on a river in the after his canoe capsized; however, it is unknown whether or not his death was attributable to Debby. Throughout Polk County, 115 homes were damaged, mainly as a result of tornadoes, and losses were estimated at $5 million. A tornado in Hardee County felled several trees and damaged a tractor and a barn. In Glades County, one tornado caused minor roof damage to a barn in Muse, while the other resulted in no effects. In Highlands County, four homes were destroyed and twenty-four more were damaged to varying degrees by two tornadoes. Losses in the county reached approximately $1.4 million. Several homes were damaged by the two twisters in Highlands County, with one resulting in a fatality near Venus. With the substantial loss of beaches, tourism in the region is expected to suffer significantly. Portions of Upham Beach in Pinellas County were completely eroded up to the seawall and other areas in that county had lost  of sand. In Pass-a-Grille, Debby's storm surge flooded coastal hotels with ankle-deep water as the dunes were washed away. Throughout St. Pete Beach, 30–40 homes were damaged by a tornado spawned by Debby. Losses throughout the city were estimated at $1.5 million. The storm damage 74 buildings, 6 of which were destroyed. The highest storm surge was estimated to have reached  in height. As a result, portions of Bay Shore Boulevard were inundated for three days.

On Anna Maria Island in Manatee County, water reached the retention walls of several condos, some of which were undermined, allowing water to enter beach-side pools. The most significant losses were on the south side of the island where up to half of the dunes were lost. Wind and floods damaged 52 structures, with losses reaching $540,000. At Lido Beach, high water flooded a parking lot. Damage to area beaches from erosion was estimated at $1.9 million. A state of emergency was declared due to storm surge damage in the county. The first tornado in Collier County caused minor roof damage to a few structures near Naples on June 23. A second tornado in the county later that day broke light poles and snapped tree limbs in North Naples, with one person being injured by a falling branch. Three others twisters were spawned in Collier County on June 24, though damage was no more than a few downed trees. The Charlotte County Airport recorded a  wind gust, while the highest rainfall total was  near Englewood. Damage reached $2.5 million and was mostly from beach erosion and coastal flooding. Rough tides and storm surge caused beach erosion and coastal flooding, especially at Captiva and Sanibel Islands. The county suffered approximately $2.3 million in losses.

South Florida and Elsewhere

At the Palm Beach International Airport in West Palm Beach, of precipitation fell in only one hour. Further south in Pompano Beach,  of rain was reported in a 24-hour period. A tornado in Palm Beach County damaged a few houses and some vegetation in Lake Worth. The other twister in Palm Beach County snapped some trees, blew a gate across a street, and broke a railroad crossing arm. A waterspout offshore Miami-Dade County moved inland near Golden Beach and twisted three gates and blew open a garage door.
Offshore in the Gulf of Mexico, nine oil production platforms and one drilling rig were damaged. Overall, United States oil production decreased by 2%. On June 25, 44% of the daily oil and 33% of the daily natural gas production in the Gulf of Mexico was shut down. The following day, companies began returning employees to platforms and production was rapidly restored. A man in Orange Beach, Alabama drowned after being swept away by heavy surf. Off the coast of South Carolina, one person went missing and is presumed dead after rescuers failed to find him after several days.

Aftermath
Following the storm, U,S. president Barack Obama issued a disaster declaration for Baker, Bradford, Citrus, Clay, Columbia, Duval, Franklin, Gilchrist, Hernando, Highlands, Hillsborough, Lafayette, Manatee, Nassau, Pasco, Pinellas, Polk, Sarasota, Suwannee, Taylor, Union, and Wakulla Counties of Florida. In Citrus County, total individual assistance of $127,000 was paid out to 140 residents, including $112,000 in damage to housing. A total of 1,671 applications for individual assistance were filed in Pinellas County, totaling $900,000.

See also

Other storms of the same name
Hurricane Agnes
Tropical Storm Fay (2008)
Tropical Storm Henri (2003)

References

External links

Tropical Storm Debby Advisory Archive
Photos of Tropical Storm Debby damage

Debby
2012 in Florida
Debby 2012
Hurricanes in Alabama
Hurricanes in Florida
Hurricanes in Georgia (U.S. state)
2012 natural disasters in the United States
June 2012 events in the United States
Debby